Donald Curran Shoup (born August 24, 1938) is an American engineer and professor in urban planning. He is a research professor of urban planning at University of California, Los Angeles and a noted Georgist economist. His 2005 book The High Cost of Free Parking identifies the negative repercussions of off-street parking requirements and relies heavily on 'Georgist' insights about optimal land use and rent distribution. In 2015, the American Planning Association awarded Shoup the "National Planning Excellence Award for a Planning Pioneer."

Early life and career
Shoup was born in Long Beach, California, in 1938. When he was two years old, his family moved to Hawaii for his father's work in the U.S. Navy. He arrived in New Haven, Connecticut, in the late 1950s at the peak of New Haven Mayor Richard C. Lee's efforts to build major parking garages and improve city traffic flow with the Oak Street Connector and other urban renewal projects. 

He received undergraduate degrees from Yale College in electrical engineering and economics, and a doctorate in economics from Yale in 1968. After completing his PhD he headed west, assuming a post as research economist at UCLA's Institute for Government and Public Affairs. After a four-year stint as a professor at the University of Michigan, Shoup returned to UCLA as an Associate Professor of Urban Planning in 1974, and later was awarded a full professorship in 1980.

Parking 
Originally focused on public finance and land value tax theory, in 1975 Shoup was inspired by a master's thesis that found that Los Angeles County employees were almost twice as likely to drive alone than federal employees in the Los Angeles Civic Center due to the availability of free parking. Shoup has extensively studied parking as a key link between transportation and land use, with important consequences for cities, the economy, and the environment. In a 2004 paper titled The Ideal Source of Local Public Revenue, Shoup argued for the application of Georgist tax theory to urban parking and transportation issues.

Shoup popularized the theory that an 85% occupancy rate of on-street parking spaces would be the most efficient use of public parking. When cars at any given destination in a city (a block or group of blocks) occupy more than 85% of on-street parking spaces, then cars arriving at that destination are forced to circle the block for a few minutes in order to find an unoccupied parking space. This small search time per car creates a surprisingly large amount of traffic congestion because, typically, many cars are searching for parking simultaneously during peak driving times. This wastes time and fuel and increases air pollution. Shoup calls this phenomenon of excess driving resulting from under-priced parking "cruising for parking".

His research on employer-paid parking led to the passage of California’s parking cash-out law, and to changes in the Internal Revenue Code to encourage parking cash out. His research on municipal parking policies has led cities to charge fair market prices for curb parking and to dedicate the resulting meter revenue to finance added public services in the metered districts.

Shoup's attempts to turn theory into practice have, on occasion, led to controversy.

Shoup is a Fellow of the American Institute of Certified Planners, and has served as Director of the Institute of Transportation Studies and as Chair of the Department of Urban Planning at UCLA. He has served as a visiting scholar at the University of Hawaii, Cambridge University, and the World Bank Shoup also serves on the advisory board of the Parking Reform Network.

Bibliography

Books
 Shoup, Donald and Ruth P. Mack. Advance land acquisition by local governments: benefit-cost analysis as an aid to policy (1968). Institute of Public Administration.
 Shoup, Donald and Don Pickerell. Free Parking as a Transportation Problem. (1980). U.S. Department of Transportation
 ——. Evaluating the Effects of Parking Cash Out: Eight Case Studies. (1997) California Environmental Protection Agency.
 ——. Parking Cash Out. (2005). APA Planning Advisory Service.
 Shoup, Donald. The High Cost of Free Parking. (2005) APA Planners Press.  (Revised 2011. )
 Shoup, Donald (editor). Parking and the City. (2018) Routledge. .

Selected articles
 Shoup, Donald. "The optimal timing of urban land development." (1970). Papers in Regional Science 25(1), 33-44.
 Shoup, Donald, with Ronald Wilson. "Parking subsidies and travel choices: assessing the evidence." (1990). Transportation 17 (2), 141-157
 Shoup, Donald. "Cashing out free parking." (1982). Transportation Quarterly 36(3)
 "An opportunity to reduce minimum parking requirements." (1995). Journal of the American Planning Association 61(1), 14-28.
 "In lieu of required parking." (1999). Journal of Planning Education and Research 18(4), 307-320.
 "The trouble with minimum parking requirements." (1999). Transportation Research Part A: Policy and Practice 33(7), 549-574.
 "Cruising for parking." (2006). Transport Policy 13(6), 479-486.

References

External links
UCLA faculty biography
The Access Almanac - Solar Parking Requirements

Living people
Georgist economists
UCLA Luskin School of Public Affairs faculty
University of Michigan faculty
Urban theorists
Yale College alumni
1938 births
American male writers